The Brazil men's national under-19 volleyball team represents Brazil in international men's volleyball competitions and friendly matches under  the age 19 and it is ruled by the Brazilian Volleyball Federation that is a member of South American volleyball body Confederación Sudamericana de Voleibol (CSV) and the international volleyball body government the Fédération Internationale de Volleyball (FIVB).

Results

Summer Youth Olympics
 Champions   Runners up   Third place   Fourth place

U19 World Championship
 Champions   Runners up   Third place   Fourth place

U19 South America Championship
 Champions   Runners up   Third place   Fourth place

U19 Pan-American Cup
 Champions   Runners up   Third place   Fourth place

Team

Current squad

The following is the Brazilian roster in the 2015 FIVB Volleyball Boys' U19 World Championship.

Head Coach: Percy Oncken

Former squads

U19 World Championship 
2003 —  Gold medal
Douglas Barbosa, Luiz Zech Coelho, Thiago Machado, Thiago Soares Alves (c), Victor Goncalves, Fábio Paes, Breno Oliveira, Danilo Carvalho, Igor Braz Pinto, Moyses Junior, Silmar Almeida and Everaldo Silva
2005 —  Silver medal
Wanderson Campos, Guilherme Hage, Lucas de Jeus, Lucas Vieira, Alan Pinto, William Costa, Carlos Kalakauskas Junior, Carlos Faccin (c), Deivid Costa, José Santos Junior, Murilo Radke and Dhiego Gemi
2007 — 7th place
Aurélio Figueiredo, Tiago Wesz, Levi Cabral, Maurício Silva, Murilo Radke (c), Guilherme Koepp, Najari Carvalho, Anderson Ventura, Renan Buiatti, Isac Santos, Rodrigo Menicucci and Thales Hoss
2009 — 9th place
Marcelo Alves, Augusto Santos, Pedro Reck, Victor Hugo Pereira, Ary Neto, Eykman Silva, Otávio Pinto (c), Ricardo Lucarelli Souza, Guilherme Gentil, Renan Purificação, Thiago Araujo and Hugo Hamacher Silva
2011 — 9th place
Alan Souza, Thiago Veloso (c), Rogério Filho, Felipe Hernandez, Jonatas Cardoso, Leandro Santos, João Ferreira, Flávio Gualberto, Alisson Melo, Tarcisio Guinter, Henrique Batagim and Wagner Silva
2013 — 5th place
Fabio Rodrigues (c), Rodrigo Leão, Rogério Filho, Enrico Zappoli, Lindomar Jùnior, Leonardo Nascimento, Nicolas Santos, Jonatan Silva, Douglas Souza, Fernando Kreling, Douglas Bastos and Lucas Madaloz
2015 — 6th place
Kaio Ribeiro, Fernando Rodrigues, Leonardo Cardoso, Erick Costa, Daniel Pinho (c), Gabriel Bertolini, Jefferson Souza, Bruno Conte, Vitor Baesso, Lucas Barreto, Alexandre Elias and Bernardo Westermann
2017 — 8th place
Victor Cardoso, Bruno Ruivo, Carlos Henrique Silva, Gabriel Cotrim, Erick Hércio, André Saliba, Marcus Coelho, Guilherme Voss Santos, Arthur Nath, João Franck (c), João Vitor Santos and Welinton Oppenkoski
2019 — 9th place
Darlan Souza, Gustavo Orlando (c), Lucas Lima da Silva, Rafael da Paz, Adriano Cavalcante, Paulo Vinicios da Silva, Nathan Krupp, Guilherme Rech, Leonardo Andrade, Pedro Tomasi, Otávio Brasil, and Leandro Campos Junior

See also
 Brazil men's national volleyball team
 Brazil men's national under-23 volleyball team
 Brazil men's national under-21 volleyball team
 Brazil women's national under-23 volleyball team
 Brazil women's national under-20 volleyball team
 Brazil women's national under-18 volleyball team

References

External links
Official website 

Volleyball
National men's under-19 volleyball teams
Volleyball in Brazil